is a Japanese former football player.

Club statistics
Updated to 23 February 2019.

1Includes Japanese Super Cup and FIFA Club World Cup.

References

External links

Profile at Kashiwa Reysol

1982 births
Living people
Ryutsu Keizai University alumni
Association football people from Chiba Prefecture
Japanese footballers
J1 League players
J2 League players
FC Tokyo players
Kashiwa Reysol players
Association football midfielders